"(Keep Feeling) Fascination" is a song by British synthpop group the Human League. It was composed by Jo Callis and Philip Oakey, and produced by Martin Rushent (which would be the last song he produced for the band for seven years).

The song features vocals from four of the band members, including lead singer Philip Oakey, female co-vocalists Susan Ann Sulley and Joanne Catherall, and a rare vocal role from keyboardist and guitarist Jo Callis.

The single was designated 'Red' on the Human League's short-lived, self-imposed labelling system of 'Blue' for pop songs and 'Red' for dance tracks.

Chart performance and certifications
The single was released in the UK on 15 April 1983 as a non-album single, and went to number 2 in the UK Singles Chart.  It was incorporated into the band's EP Fascination!. Released in the US a month after the UK release, the single reached number 1 on the US Hot Dance Music/Club Play chart (their first single to do so) and number 8 on the US Billboard Hot 100 that summer. 
The EP Fascination!  contained two versions of "(Keep Feeling) Fascination"; the extended mix and an improvisation, both different from the single version. These were also the tracks featured on the 12-inch issue in the UK. The 7-inch issue featured a new instrumental track on the B-side, "Total Panic".

Music video

The video for "(Keep Feeling) Fascination" was filmed in a semi-derelict area of Newham, London which was due for demolition and redevelopment as part of the widescale redevelopment of Docklands and East London which took place in the early 1980s. The video begins with an aerial view of an orange "you are here" dot on a street map, which is revealed as an actual giant orange dot on the ground as the camera zooms in. The dot highlights a single house on the apex of two streets, and the camera passes through a set of window curtains to show the band playing the song inside. The entire room is painted grey, as are the band's instruments and microphones. During the song's bridge, two boys are shown kicking a ball around in the street outside. Both the ball and one boy's clothes turn orange when they enter the dot; when he kicks the ball back, it returns to its original colour. As the song ends, the camera retreats from the room and zooms back out into the sky, the view changing back to the original map.

Unusually for Human League videos to this point, the band are all seen playing instruments as if it were a live performance. Philip Oakey said in 1983:

Both the house (which was First Avenue, London E13 8AP) and surrounding area (Junction of 1st Avenue and 3rd Avenue) encompassed by the orange dot were completely painted orange, including a nearby Austin 1800 car. The video was conceived and directed by Steve Barron, who directed most of the Human League's early 1980s music videos. The band's scenes were all filmed in a studio; Susan Ann Sulley said that the house was still occupied by a family during the painting and filming of the external scenes. The house remained orange until being demolished in mid-1983.

Track listings
7-inch vinyl (Virgin - VS 569)
 "(Keep Feeling) Fascination" – 3:39
 "Total Panic" – 3:23

12-inch vinyl (Virgin - VS569-12)
 "(Keep Feeling) Fascination" (extended version) – 5:00
 "(Keep Feeling) Fascination" (improvisation) – 6:15

Mini-CD (Virgin - CDT24)
 "(Keep Feeling) Fascination" (extended 12-inch version) – 5:00
 "(Keep Feeling) Fascination" (improvisation 12-icnh dub) – 6:15
 "Total Panic" – 3:23
CD released in 1988.

Charts

Weekly charts

Year-end charts

Certifications

In popular culture
 A cover version of the song recorded by Rob Crow (of Pinback), features in the 2010 commercial for Kingsford Charcoal.
 A cover version of the song recorded by the OV7 group features in the album Siete Latidos (2001).

References

External links
 http://www.the-black-hit-of-space.dk/keep_feeling_fascination.htm
 Available to watch on YouTube at https://www.youtube.com/watch?v=QqqBs6kkzHE

1983 singles
1983 songs
A&M Records singles
The Human League songs
Song recordings produced by Martin Rushent
Songs written by Jo Callis
Songs written by Philip Oakey
Virgin Records singles